Mark A. Rycroft (born July 12, 1978) is a Canadian former professional ice hockey right winger who played in the National Hockey League (NHL) for the St. Louis Blues and Colorado Avalanche. Rycroft is currently a TV studio analyst for Altitude Sports and Entertainment, the local affiliate of the Colorado Avalanche.

Playing career
Prior to playing professional hockey, Rycroft played two seasons with Nanaimo Clippers in the British Columbia Hockey League (BCHL) and three collegiate seasons at the University of Denver. Having gone undrafted in any NHL Entry Draft, on May 15, 2000, Rycroft signed an NHL contract with the St. Louis Blues as a free agent. In the 2001–02 season, he made his NHL debut with the Blues. 

During the 2004–05 NHL lockout, Rycroft played for the Diables Rouges de Briançon in the Ligue Magnus. On July 12, 2006, he was signed as a free agent by the Colorado Avalanche to a two-year contract. After playing the 2006–07 season with the Avalanche, Rycroft was assigned to the club's American Hockey League (AHL) affiliate, the Lake Erie Monsters, to start the 2007–08 season.

On January 22, 2008, Rycroft was traded to the Columbus Blue Jackets in exchange for Darcy Campbell and Philippe Dupuis. He was immediately assigned to the Blue Jackets' AHL affiliate, Syracuse Crunch, and ultimately never played a game for Columbus. On July 17, 2008, Rycroft signed with Dinamo Minsk of the newly-formed Kontinental Hockey League (KHL), but was later released without having played a game for the team.

Rycroft is currently a TV color commentator for Altitude Sports and Entertainment, the local affiliate of the Colorado Avalanche.

Career statistics

Awards and honours

References

External links

1978 births
Living people
Canadian ice hockey right wingers
Colorado Avalanche players
Denver Pioneers men's ice hockey players
Diables Rouges de Briançon players
Ice hockey people from British Columbia
Lake Erie Monsters players
Sportspeople from Penticton
St. Louis Blues players
Syracuse Crunch players
Undrafted National Hockey League players
University of Denver alumni
Worcester IceCats players
Canadian expatriate ice hockey players in France